Isophrictis actinopa is a moth of the family Gelechiidae,  described by Edward Meyrick in 1929. It is found in North America, where it has been recorded from Texas.

References

Isophrictis
Moths described in 1929
Moths of North America
Taxa named by Edward Meyrick